Diffin can refer to:
 Charles Willard Diffin, a 20th century American writer and engineer
 a community in Limestone Township, Michigan